Éric Tessier (born March 19, 1966) is a Canadian film and television director and screenwriter from Quebec. He received a Canadian Screen Award nomination for Best Adapted Screenplay at the 10th Canadian Screen Awards in 2022, for the film You Will Remember Me (Tu te souviendras de moi).

Filmography

Film
Evil Words (Sur le seuil) - 2003
Vendus - 2004
5150 Elm's Way (5150, rue des Ormes) - 2009
The Pee-Wee 3D: The Winter That Changed My Life (Les Pee-Wee 3d: L'hiver qui a changé ma vie) - 2012
9 (9, le film) - 2016
Junior Majeur - 2017
You Will Remember Me (Tu te souviendras de moi) - 2020

Television
 3X Rien - 2003
 Rumours - 2006
 La chambre no 13 - 2006
 Sophie - 2008
 O' - 2012
 Pour Sarah - 2015

References

External links

1966 births
Living people
21st-century Canadian screenwriters
21st-century Canadian male writers
Canadian screenwriters in French
Film directors from Quebec
Writers from Quebec
People from Capitale-Nationale
Canadian television directors